Stephen James "Steve" McCabe (born 4 August 1955) is a British politician who has served as Member of Parliament (MP) for Birmingham Selly Oak since 2010. A member of the Labour Party, he was previously MP for Birmingham Hall Green from 1997 to 2010.

Early life

Born in the shipbuilding town of Port Glasgow on the River Clyde, McCabe attended the Port Glasgow High School before studying at the Moray House College (later named Moray House School of Education, University of Edinburgh) in Edinburgh, where he was awarded a Diploma in Social Studies (Certificate Qualification Social Work) in 1977 and qualified as a social worker.

He worked initially as a social worker in Wolverhampton for six years from 1977, and from 1978 to 1982 he served as a shop steward with the National and Local Government Officers Association. 

In 1983, he was appointed manager of the Priory in Thatcham, providing alternatives to care and custody for young people, for Berkshire Social Services. He left the Priory in 1985 and returned to education, taking an MA in Social Work at the University of Bradford in 1986.

Following his degree, he worked as a social services lecturer at the North East Worcestershire College in Redditch. In 1989, he became a child care worker in Solihull until 1991 when was appointed as an education adviser to the Central Council for Education and Training in Social Work (now called the General Social Care Council). He remained in this position until his election to the House of Commons.

He was elected as a councillor to Birmingham City Council in 1990 and served until 1998, during which time he served as the chair of the city's technical services committee.

Parliamentary career

McCabe was elected as the Labour MP for Birmingham Hall Green at the 1997 general election when he unseated the Conservative member Andrew Hargreaves by 8,420 votes in the Labour landslide; the first time a Labour MP held the seat.

He served as the Parliamentary Private Secretary to Charles Clarke in his capacity as Secretary of State for Education and Skills (2003–2004) and as Home Secretary (2004–2005). He joined the government Whips Office in 2006 as an Assistant, and from 2007 was a Lord Commissioner to the Treasury (a full Whip). He also served on various select committees, including Northern Ireland Affairs Select Committee (1998–2003) and Home Affairs Select Committee (2005–2006 and 2010–2013).

In October 2006, he applied for selection to the redrawn Birmingham Selly Oak seat, which incorporated much of his existing seat. Following the announcement by Lynne Jones, the sitting member for Selly Oak, in January 2007 that she would stand down at the next election, he became the favourite to be selected for the newly drawn constituency, and was duly selected by the local Labour party. He decided not to apply for the redrawn Hall Green seat on the grounds that its boundaries were significantly different from the existing seat of the same name.

He was re-elected, in Selly Oak, at the May 2010 general election.

From 2013 to 2015, he served as a Shadow Minister for Children and Families as part of Ed Miliband's front bench team.

McCabe called in 2013 for a referendum on remaining in the EU to be held "as soon as possible", stating he found himself "at odds with his party" on the issue. McCabe joined 18 other Labour MPs in backing a referendum on Europe in a House of Commons vote called by rebel Conservative MPs.

McCabe was appointed Parliamentary Chair of the Labour Friends of Israel in February 2020. He is a long-standing supporter and visited Israel as part of a delegation in 2019.

Expenses
In the 2009 expenses scandal that included over 50 MPs it was revealed that McCabe had over-claimed on his mortgage by £4,059. A three-month investigation by the parliamentary fees office resulted in McCabe calling for Commons officials to be sacked. He later said: "I did make an error in my claim and, as the letter from the fees office shows, this money was repaid in a deduction from my next claim". Between 2004 and 2008, McCabe claimed £54,699 in expenses for his second home, on which he has a £60,000 mortgage. The claims included £5,500 for a new kitchen.

Political positions 
McCabe supports sanctions against Iran to "curb their nuclear ambitions". McCabe was a supporter of the Abraham Accords.

Personal life
In 2012, McCabe underwent open heart surgery at the Queen Elizabeth Hospital Birmingham for a heart murmur.

On 1 August 2017, McCabe suffered minor facial injuries after a motorcyclist in Kings Heath, Birmingham threw a brick at him, which he reported to the police.

References

External links

 Steve McCabe website
 
 

1955 births
Living people
Alumni of the University of Edinburgh
Alumni of the University of Bradford
Councillors in Birmingham, West Midlands
Labour Party (UK) MPs for English constituencies
UK MPs 1997–2001
UK MPs 2001–2005
UK MPs 2005–2010
UK MPs 2010–2015
UK MPs 2015–2017
UK MPs 2017–2019
UK MPs 2019–present
People from Johnstone
Labour Party (UK) councillors
Labour Friends of Israel